The Yingzidu Dam is a concrete-face rock-fill dam on the Sancha River, a tributary of the Wu River, in Pingba County of Guizhou Province, China. The purpose of the dam is hydroelectric power production and flood control. It supports a 360 MW power station located just downstream. Construction on the dam began on 8 November 2000 and on 10 April 2003 it began to impound its reservoir. On 22 May of the same year the first generator was commissioned, the second in August. By June 2004, the project was complete.

See also 

 List of dams and reservoirs in China
 List of tallest dams in China

References

Dams in China
Concrete-face rock-fill dams
Dams completed in 2003
Energy infrastructure completed in 2004
Hydroelectric power stations in Guizhou